Wu (Chinese: 吳; pinyin: Wú; Middle Chinese *ŋuo < Eastern Han Chinese: *ŋuɑ), known in historiography as Eastern Wu or Sun Wu, was a dynastic state of China and one of the three major states that competed for supremacy over China in the Three Kingdoms period. It previously existed from 220 to 222 as a vassal kingdom nominally under Cao Wei, its rival state, but declared independence from Cao Wei and became a sovereign state in November 222. It became an empire in May 229 after its founding ruler, Sun Quan (Emperor Da), declared himself emperor. Its name was derived from the place it was based in — the Jiangnan (Yangtze River Delta) region, which was also historically known as "Wu". It was referred to as "Dong Wu" ("Eastern Wu") or "Sun Wu" by historians to distinguish it from other Chinese historical states with similar names which were also located in that region, such as the Wu state in the Spring and Autumn period and the Wuyue kingdom in the Five Dynasties and Ten Kingdoms period. It was called "Eastern Wu" because it occupied most of eastern China in the Three Kingdoms period, and "Sun Wu" because the family name of its rulers was "Sun". During its existence, Wu's capital was at Jianye (present-day Nanjing, Jiangsu), but at times it was also at Wuchang (present-day Ezhou, Hubei).

History

Beginnings and founding

Towards the end of the Han dynasty, Sun Ce, the eldest son of the warlord Sun Jian, and his followers borrowed troops from the warlord Yuan Shu and embarked on a series of military conquests in the Jiangdong and Wu regions between 194 and 199, seizing several territories previously occupied by warlords such as Liu Yao, Yan Baihu and Wang Lang. Sun Ce broke off relations with Yuan Shu around 196–197 after the latter declared himself emperor — an act deemed as treason against Emperor Xian, the figurehead ruler of the Han dynasty. The warlord Cao Cao, who was the de facto head of government in the Han imperial court, asked Emperor Xian to grant Sun Ce the title of "Marquis of Wu".

Sun Ce was assassinated in the summer of 200 and was succeeded by his younger brother, Sun Quan. Sun Quan, like his elder brother, also paid nominal allegiance to Emperor Xian while maintaining autonomous rule over the Wu territories. In 208, Sun Quan allied with the warlord Liu Bei and they combined forces to defeat Cao Cao at the Battle of Red Cliffs. Sun Quan and Liu Bei maintained their alliance against Cao Cao after the battle for the next ten years or so, despite having some territorial disputes over Jing Province. In 219, Sun Quan severed ties with Liu Bei when he sent his general Lü Meng to invade Liu's territories in Jing Province. Guan Yu, who was defending Liu Bei's assets in Jing Province, was captured and executed by Sun Quan's forces. After that, the boundaries of Sun Quan's domain extended from beyond the Jiangdong region to include the southern part of Jing Province, which covered roughly present-day Hunan and parts of Hubei.

In 220, Cao Cao's son and successor, Cao Pi, ended the Han dynasty by forcing Emperor Xian to abdicate in his favour and established the state of Cao Wei. Sun Quan agreed to submit to Wei and was granted the title of a vassal king, "King of Wu", by Cao Pi. A year later, Liu Bei declared himself emperor and founded the state of Shu Han. In 222, Liu Bei launched a military campaign against Sun Quan to take back Jing Province and avenge Guan Yu, leading to the Battle of Xiaoting. However, Liu Bei suffered a crushing defeat at the hands of Sun Quan's general Lu Xun and was forced to retreat to Baidicheng, where he died a year later.

Liu Bei's successor, Liu Shan, and his regent, Zhuge Liang, made peace with Sun Quan later and reaffirmed their previous alliance. Sun Quan declared independence from Wei in 222, but continued to rule as "King of Wu" until 229, when he declared himself "Emperor of Wu". His legitimacy was recognised by Shu.

To distinguish the state from other historical Chinese states of the same name, historians have added a relevant character to the state's original name: the state that called itself "Wu" (吳) is also known as "Eastern Wu" (東吳; Dōng Wú) or "Sun Wu" (孫吳).

Sun Quan's reign
Sun Quan ruled for over 30 years and his long reign resulted in stability in southern China. During his reign, Wu engaged Wei in numerous wars, including the battles of Ruxu (222–223), Shiting (228), and Hefei (234). However, Wu never managed to gain any territory north of the Yangtze River while Wei also never succeeded in conquering the lands south of the Yangtze.

A succession struggle broke out between Sun Quan's sons in the later part of his reign — Sun Quan installed Sun He as the crown prince in 242 after his former heir apparent, Sun Deng, died in 241, but Sun He soon became involved in a rivalry with his younger brother, Sun Ba. The conflict resulted in the emergence of two rivalling factions, each supporting either Sun He or Sun Ba, in Sun Quan's imperial court. Sun Quan eventually deposed Sun He and forced Sun Ba to commit suicide, while Lu Xun and many other ministers who took either Sun He's or Sun Ba's side in the struggle met with unhappy ends. Sun Quan appointed his youngest son, Sun Liang, as the crown prince after the incident.

Reigns of Sun Liang and Sun Xiu
Sun Quan died in 252 and was succeeded by Sun Liang, with Zhuge Ke and Sun Jun serving as regents. In 253, Zhuge Ke was assassinated in a coup launched by Sun Jun, and the state power of Wu fell into Sun Jun's hands and was passed on to his cousin, Sun Chen, after his death. During Sun Liang's reign, two rebellions broke out in the Wei garrison at Shouchun (around present-day Shou County, Anhui) in 255 and 257–258. Sun Jun and Sun Chen led Wu forces to support the rebels in the first and second rebellions respectively in the hope of making some territorial gains in Wei, but both revolts were suppressed and the Wu forces retreated after suffering many losses.

Sun Liang was deposed in 258 by Sun Chen, who installed Sun Xiu, another son of Sun Quan, on the throne. Sun Xiu killed Sun Chen later in a coup with the help of Zhang Bu and Ding Feng.

Fall of Wu
Sun Xiu died of illness in 264, a year after Shu was conquered by Wei. At the time, Wu was experiencing internal turmoil because rebellions had broken out in Jiaozhi in the south. The ministers Puyang Xing, Wan Yu and Zhang Bu decided to install Sun He's son, Sun Hao, on the throne.

In the beginning of Sun Hao's reign, the emperor reduced taxes, gave relief to the poor, and granted freedom to a large number of palace maids. However, Sun Hao gradually became more cruel and superstitious and started indulging in wine and women instead of finding ways to revive his declining state. Sun Hao's tyranny caused widespread anger and hatred towards him in Wu, but it was due to the efforts of officials such as Lu Kai and Lu Kang that Wu was able to remain relatively stable and peaceful.

In February 266, Sima Yan ended the state of Cao Wei by forcing its last ruler, Cao Huan, to abdicate in his favour, and then established the Jin dynasty. In 279, Jin forces led by Du Yu, Wang Jun and others attacked Wu from six directions. Sun Hao attempted to put up resistance by sending his armies to fight the Jin invaders, but the Wu forces suffered several consecutive defeats and even the Wu chancellor, Zhang Ti, was killed in action. Seeing that Wu was doomed to fall, Sun Hao surrendered to the Jin dynasty on 31 May 280, marking the end of Wu and the end of the Three Kingdoms period.

Government and military
Despite Sun Quan proclaiming himself emperor in 229, its politics reflected its warlord origins.  When Wu was initially founded its military was dominated by famed generals who had gained their positions through prowess and pluck.  These generals were celebrated for their individualism.

Politics within the court were often influenced by conflicts between powerful families and individuals.  Positions within the court were inherited from one generation to the next unlike the Han dynasty's bureaucracy.  However, over time, the influence ultimately would move away from the central government. Outside of the court, families displayed their own independent authority. Wu, at times, was to a certain extent run for the protection of particular families.

The Eastern Wu era was a formative period in Vietnamese history. The ruler of Jiaozhou (modern Vietnam and Guangzhou), Shi Xie, is primarily remembered today in Vietnam as Sĩ Nhiếp. According to Stephen O'Harrow, Shi Xie was essentially "the first Vietnamese." Originally satisfied with Eastern Wu's rule, the Vietnamese opposed Shi Hui's rebellion against Eastern Wu and attacked him for it. However, when the Wu general Lü Dai betrayed Shi Hui and executed the entire Shi family, the Vietnamese became greatly upset. In 248, the people of Jiaozhi and Jiuzhen commanderies rebelled. Eastern Wu sent Lu Yin to deal with the rebels. He managed to pacify the rebels with a combination of threats and persuasion. However the rebels regrouped under the leadership of Lady Triệu in Jiuzhen and renewed the rebellion with a march on Jiaozhi. According to the Đại Việt sử ký toàn thư (Complete Annals of Đại Việt), Lady Triệu had long breasts that reached her shoulders and rode into battle on an elephant. After several months of warfare she was defeated and committed suicide.

Culture and economy

The culture of Wu was most solidified under the reign of Sun Quan from 229 to 252. Migrations from the north and the needed settlement from the Shanyue barbarians made it possible for the increase in manpower, agriculture, and settling the lower most parts of Wu. Along with that, river transportation became a huge factor and flourished as the Jiangnan and Zhedong canals were finished with construction. After the Battle of Xiaoting and during the invasions of Wu by Wei in the 220s, Shu was able to reestablish their trade and relationships with Wu. Shu's cotton was a great influx for Wu, and the development of shipbuilding, salt, and metal industries was greatly increased.

The fact of inflation and economic problems still were in existence since the Han dynasty. Sun Quan tried to start a currency of large coins manufactured by copper. He also tried to prohibit private minting. This policy was terminated in 246 due to ineffectiveness.

Eastern Wu was able to make close overseas trade with countries such as Vietnam and Cambodia. Wu also traded with India and the Middle East.

Civil matters
Personages with clerical or scholarly abilities had roles to play within the state, but the policies were more determined by those of military command. Nevertheless, every Wu army was in need of administrative support and, according to Rafe de Crespigny, certain scholars were "recognised as practical counsellors, regardless of their fighting prowess or their ability to command troops in the field."

Under the reign of Sun Quan, he needed a strong role of advisors and secretaries in order to keep his link of power in a maintained level. Sun Quan's prestige in dealing with hostiles and friendly relations called for the establishment of a controlled form of an imperial government for the empire of Wu. Sun Quan also created the opportunity for people residing within Wu to gain prestige and influence throughout the empire and the surrounding establishments with the duty of being an envoy.

Following the death of Cao Pi in 226, Sun Quan strongly promoted his kingdom to focus on agriculture because the threat from Wei was lifted. However, Lu Xun suggested to Sun Quan that military commanders should become involved in the colonization of land. Sun Quan quickly accepted and he, along with his sons would execute the memorial presented by Lu Xun. However, in 240, Sun Quan restrained Lu Xun's idea and refocused on agricultural works, because Wu came to suffer a severe famine. In 234, when Zhuge Ke was in control of affairs in the south, he strongly ignored the colonisation order and viciously ordered the agriculture factor, often starving enemies into submission.

Legacy

Under the rule of Wu, the Yangtze River Delta region, regarded in early history as a barbaric "jungle", developed into one of the commercial, cultural, and political centres of China. The achievements of Wu in the south marked the coming of Chinese civilization to the farthest southern reaches of the empire.

In 230, the island of Taiwan was reached by the Chinese during the Three Kingdoms period under the reign of Sun Quan. Contact with the native population and the dispatch of officials to an island named "Yizhou" by the Wu navy might have been to Taiwan, but the location of Yizhou is open to dispute; some historians believe it was Taiwan, while others believe it was the Ryukyu Islands. Wu merchants also may have reached Southern Vietnam and Cambodia. Failed protection of Gongsun Yuan also was in existence when the latter rebelled against Wei. This was because of the waterway's difficulties. Such things cost Wu, and the achievements supposedly gained within Taiwan did not cover this problem and Sun Quan lost his vassal.

Later on in the existence of Wu, the once great military was turned to an unimpressive one. It was most likely an easy task to take Hefei from Wei, but Wu could not do so. Since the 230s, this task was made harder due to the "New City", a heavily fortified castle built at Hefei by Wei. One of the greatest failures to accomplish something later on in Wu's reign was during 255 and during the last few years of the 250s. When Guanqiu Jian and Wen Qin rebelled against Wei, Wu promised to help the two in Shouchun (around present-day Shou County, Anhui). However, the Wu forces never made it in time before the rebellion was quashed by Sima Shi and the Wei forces. When Zhuge Dan launched a massive full-scale rebellion, the Wu forces suffered a great defeat as they lent a great quantity of manpower to Zhuge Dan's cause. Shouchun was quickly regained by Wei under Sima Zhao's command.

During the conquest of Shu by Wei in 263, Wu could not fully lend support to their allies due to a revolt in Vietnam.

The decline of Wu was long in existence since the death of Lu Xun in 245 and the death of Sun Quan in 252. Sun Quan's successors could do little for the empire. Zhuge Ke was assassinated by Sun Jun in 253 after a failed invasion of Hefei following the Wu victory over an invading Wei force at Dongxing. Ding Feng also ended up killing Sun Chen under orders from Sun Xiu. Corruption plagued Wu, which led to an easy conquest of Wu by the Jin dynasty in 280.

List of territories

List of sovereigns

Emperors' family tree

Gallery

See also
 Eastern Wu family trees
 Three Kingdoms
 Cao Wei
 Shu Han

Notes

References

Bibliography
 
 
 

 
222 establishments
280 disestablishments
Wu (region)
Dynasties in Chinese history
Former countries in Chinese history
Former monarchies of East Asia